Kennedy J. P. Orton (1872 - 1930) was a British chemist. Initially he studied medicine at St. Thomas' Hospital, but there he became interested in chemistry and moved to St. John's College, Cambridge. He then obtained a Ph.D. summa cum laude in Heidelberg under Karl von Auwers, before working for a year with Sir William Ramsey at University College, London. He was then lecturer and demonstrator of Chemistry at St. Bartholomew's Hospital, before in 1903 being appointed Professor of Chemistry at University College of North Wales, Bangor, where he headed the department until his death. He was elected a Fellow of the Royal Society in 1921.

Besides being a chemist, he was a keen climber and ornithologist, and a biannual ornithological lecture was endowed in his name.

References

Fellows of the Royal Society
Alumni of St John's College, Cambridge
British chemists
Academics of Bangor University
Physical organic chemistry
1872 births
1930 deaths